Robert "Bob" Wren (born September 16, 1974) is a Canadian professional ice hockey center for EHC Klostersee of the Regionalliga. 

Wren was drafted 94th overall by the Los Angeles Kings in the 1993 NHL Entry Draft. He played five games in the National Hockey League; four for the Mighty Ducks of Anaheim and one game for the Toronto Maple Leafs, as well as extensively in German and Austrian leagues.

Career statistics

References

External links 

1974 births
Living people
Augsburger Panther players
Baltimore Bandits players
Binghamton Senators players
Canadian ice hockey centres
Cincinnati Mighty Ducks players
Detroit Compuware Ambassadors players
Detroit Junior Red Wings players
Detroit Vipers players
Graz 99ers players
Hannover Indians players
ERC Ingolstadt players
EHC Klostersee players
Knoxville Cherokees players
Iserlohn Roosters players
Los Angeles Kings draft picks
Mighty Ducks of Anaheim players
Milwaukee Admirals players
Nottingham Panthers players
Ice hockey people from Ontario
Sportspeople from Cambridge, Ontario
Ravensburg Towerstars players
Richmond Renegades players
St. John's Maple Leafs players
Springfield Falcons players
Toronto Maple Leafs players
Vienna Capitals players
Canadian expatriate ice hockey players in England
Canadian expatriate ice hockey players in Austria
Canadian expatriate ice hockey players in Germany